Jean Lesage  (10 June 1912 – 12 December 1980) was a Canadian lawyer and politician from Quebec. He served as the 19th premier of Quebec from 22 June 1960 to 16 June 1966. Alongside Georges-Émile Lapalme, René Lévesque and others, he is often viewed as the father of the Quiet Revolution. Quebec City International Airport was officially named in his honour on 31 March 1994, and a provincial electoral district, Jean-Lesage, was named for him, as well.

Early years
Lesage was born on June 10, 1912, in Montreal, Quebec, one of six children of Xavéri Lesage, a district manager of the insurance company Les Prévoyants du Canada, and Cécile Côté.
Lesage began his education at the kindergarten Saint-Enfant-Jésus Montréal. In 1921, the family relocated to Quebec City, where Xavéri Lesage was appointed as assistant manager by his brother Antoni in the headquarters office.

Education
Lesage enrolled as a day student in the private boarding school École Saint-Louis-de-Gonzague and, in 1923, he was admitted to the Petit Séminaire de Québec for an eight-year program which eventually led to the baccalaureate. He was a talented and bright student who ranked highly in courses, especially in religion, French, Latin, Greek and philosophy.

He enrolled in the Faculté de droit de l'Université Laval, where his natural quick wit, his facility in expressing himself, and his argumentative nature assured him success in the field of law. During his years as a student, Lesage was an active Liberal, and he became interested in having a political career. He graduated with a law degree in 1934.

In 1965, he received an honorary doctorate from Sir George Williams University, which later became Concordia University.

He was a student and a supporter of the New Left movement of the 1960s and his education was strongly influenced by figures such as Charles Darwin, Sigmund Freud, Karl Marx and Friedrich Nietzsche.

Legal career

He practised law in Quebec City with Paul Lesage in 1934, then with Charles Gavan Power, Valmore Bienvenue, Paul Lesage, and Jean Turgeon. He married Corinne Lagarde, a singer and the daughter of Alexandre Lagarde and Valéria Matte.

He was made a Crown attorney for the Wartime Prices and Trade Board from 1939 to 1944.  He served in the Canadian Army Reserve from 1939–1945.

Federal political career
Lesage was elected as a federal Member of Parliament for the riding of Montmagny-L'Islet as a Liberal for the first time in the 1945 general election. After his re-election in 1949, he was first named Parliamentary Secretary to the Secretary of State for External Affairs from 25 January 1951 to 31 December 1952. He was then named Parliamentary Secretary for the Minister of Finance from 1 January 1953 to 13 June 1953.

Following his re-election in 1953, Lesage was appointed as Minister of Resources and Development from 17 September 1953 to 15 December 1953, and then Minister of Northern Affairs and National Resources from 16 December 1953 to 21 June 1957.

He survived the Progressive Conservative ascendancy and was re-elected in both 1957 and 1958. However, he resigned from his seat on 13 June 1958 following his election as leader of the Liberal Party of Quebec on 31 May 1958.

Premier of Quebec (1960–1966)

On June 22, 1960, Lesage's Liberal party won the Quebec general election with 51 of 95 seats and 51 percent of the popular vote. He was elected to the Legislative Assembly of Quebec with the slogans "l’équipe de tonnerre" – "the terrific team" – and "C'est le temps que ça change" - "It’s time for a change". His electoral success ended the Union Nationale and Maurice Duplessis's conservative reign since 1944.

Lesage became Premier, President of the Executive Council, and Minister of Finance from 5 July 1960 to 16 June 1966. He was also Minister of Federal-Provincial Affairs from 28 March 1961 to 16 June 1966, and Minister of Revenue from 30 May 1963 to 8 August 1963.

His election ushered in the Quiet Revolution, which was the rapid and drastic change of values, attitudes, and behaviours in Quebec society also characterized by a surge in Quebec nationalism. In the previous decade, it had already ended its affiliation with the Liberal Party of Canada.

In 1962, the Liberal Party of Quebec won re-election with a campaign promising the nationalization of hydroelectricity, with the slogan Maîtres chez nous (Masters in Our Own Home).

The Lesage government’s rule significantly contributed to environmental, legal, social, economic and political changes in Quebec society, and strengthened the Québécois identity during the Quiet Revolution. The modernization of Quebec was Lesage’s main nationalism.

During his time as premier, Lesage achieved many great changes in Quebec. Lesage believed that French Canadians could very well develop as a modern people within Canada without losing their identity.

One of the major and most successful changes made by the Lesage government was the secularization of Quebec from the Catholic Church. Education reform was one of the most prominent examples of this secularization. Lesage rejected the role of the Catholic Church, which had previously controlled the school system, and modernized it. He wanted the Quebec provincial government to provide education for everyone and instill in them Québécois values as well as produce a better skilled labour force.

The mandatory schooling age was also increased from 14 to 16. The Ministry of Education was created in 1964 with Paul Gérin-Lajoie becoming Quebec’s first Minister of education.

Another major success was the establishment of Hydro-Québec and the nationalization of the province's hydro-electricity. "The nationalization of electricity was 'a logical extension' of the government’s goal of growth... based primarily on the promotion of the French-Canadian people."

With much assistance from René Lévesque, the 11 remaining private power companies were bought out, and Hydro-Québec began supplying, distributing, and transmitting the entire province's energy. The Lesage government’s success of Hydro-Québec represents strength, determination, and initiative.

Other major economic accomplishments included the creation of the Société générale de financement to encourage Quebecers to invest in their future and provided capital for private and mainly Francophone enterprises; the creation of public companies like the Société de Montage Automobile (SOMA) to assemble French automobiles in Quebec; the Société Québécoise d’Exploration Minière (SOQUEM) to ensure that mining resources would be developed in the interests of Quebecers; and Sidérurgie Québécoise (SIDBEC) which was established as an integrated steel plant.

Furthermore, during his time as Premier, Quebec also took over health care from the Church and was the only province to opt out of the national pension plan to create its own version, the Quebec Pension Plan. It also formed the Caisse de dépôt et placement du Québec to invest in the pension plan funds and the Régie des rentes du Québec to manage the plan, revamped the province’s labour force by giving public-sector workers the right to strike, and laid a foundation for the creation of post-secondary Collèges d’enseignement général et professionnel (CEGEPs) in the area of education.

Defeat and retirement
Despite winning 47% of the vote in the 1966 Quebec general election, compared to 40% for the Union Nationale, Lesage's Liberals won fewer seats because their vote was concentrated in urban ridings. Lesage remained Liberal leader for several years until he resigned in August 1969. He remained Leader of the Opposition until January 1970, when Robert Bourassa became the new Liberal leader. Lesage retired from politics and sat on several corporate boards until his death in 1980.

See also
Politics of Quebec
Quebec general elections
Quiet Revolution
History of Quebec
Mackenzie King
Québec City Jean Lesage International Airport

Book references
 Rouillard, Jacques (2003), Le syndicalisme Québécois : Deux siècles d'histoire, Boréal Editions, 335p.
 Comeau, Robert & Bourque, Gilles (1989), Jean Lesage et l'éveil d'une nation Sillery Editions, 367p.
 Thompson, Dale C. (1984) Jean Lesage and the Quiet Revolution. Macmillan of Canada.
 Thomson, Dale Carins (1984), Jean Lesage et la révolution tranquille, du Trecarre Editions, 615p.
 Fullerton, Douglas H. (1978), The dangerous delusion. McClelland and Stewart, 240p.

External links

 
 Jean Lesage and the Quiet Revolution, 1960–1966
 His Order of Canada citation

References

1912 births
1980 deaths
20th-century Canadian lawyers
Canadian humanists
Companions of the Order of Canada
Lawyers from Montreal
Liberal Party of Canada MPs
Members of the House of Commons of Canada from Quebec
Members of the King's Privy Council for Canada
Politicians from Montreal
Premiers of Quebec
Quebec Liberal Party MNAs
Quebec political party leaders
Université Laval alumni
Université Laval Faculté de droit alumni